Baxter Holt (born 21 October 1999) is an Australian cricketer who plays as a right- handed wicket-keeper-batsman for the Australia national under-19 cricket team and the Sydney Thunder in the Big Bash League. He is a graduate from The King's School, Parramatta.

Career
On 30 January 2019 Holt made his Twenty20 debut for Sydney Thunder during the 2018-19 Big Bash League season against the Melbourne Renegades, hitting 37 from 28 deliveries and adding 2 catches and a stumping. He made his first-class debut for New South Wales in the 2018–19 Sheffield Shield season on 20 March 2019.

Holt has been mentored by Southern Stars wicket-keeper Alyssa Healy and is studying for a bachelor's degree in sports science from the University of Technology and Science in Sydney. He made his List A debut on 24 November 2021, for New South Wales in the 2021–22 Marsh One-Day Cup.

References

1999 births
Living people
Australian cricketers
Sydney Thunder cricketers
New South Wales cricketers